Xicoténcatl Municipality is a municipality located in the Mexican state of Tamaulipas.  On March 15, 1751, it was founded as Escandon.  On October 27, 1828, it was renamed Xicoténcatl.

References

External links
Gobierno Municipal de Xicoténcatl Official website

Municipalities of Tamaulipas
Populated places established in 1751
1751 establishments in New Spain